Huang Xing is a Chinese paralympic sport shooter. He participated at the 2016 Summer Paralympics in the shooting competition, being awarded the gold medal in the mixed 25 m pistol. Xing participated at the 2020 Summer Paralympics in the shooting competition, being awarded the silver medal in the men's 10 m air pistol event. He also participated in the mixed 25 m pistol at the 2020 Summer Paralympics, being awarded the gold medal.

References

External links 
Paralympic Games profile

Living people
Place of birth missing (living people)
Year of birth missing (living people)
Chinese male sport shooters
Paralympic shooters of China
Paralympic gold medalists for China
Paralympic silver medalists for China
Paralympic medalists in shooting
Shooters at the 2016 Summer Paralympics
Medalists at the 2016 Summer Paralympics
Shooters at the 2020 Summer Paralympics
Medalists at the 2020 Summer Paralympics
21st-century Chinese people